Konstantin Petrovich Mikhaylov (born  October 24, 1965 in Moscow, RSFSR, USSR) is a Russian journalist, writer, ethnographer and social activist. One of the initiators of the public movement Arkhnadzor (a social movement, a voluntary non-profit association of citizens who wish to contribute to the preservation of historical monuments, landscapes and species of Moscow), a member of its Coordination Council. Since 2012, he has been a member of the Civic Chamber of the Russian Federation and a member of the Presidential Council for Culture and Arts.

His daughter is an actress working in puppet theater Shadow.

References

External links 
 Как растут аппетиты Русской Православной церкви. Константин Михайлов в гостях у Владимира Кара-Мурзы, «Радио Свобода», 2013 г.

1965 births
Living people
Russian radio personalities
Russian journalists
Russian-language writers
Moscow State University alumni
Members of the Civic Chamber of the Russian Federation